West Guji is a disputed zone between the SNNPR and the Oromia regions. West Guji is bordered on the south by Borena, on the west by the Southern Nations, Nationalities, and Peoples Region, on the north by the Gedeo Zone of Southern Nations, Nationalities, and Peoples Region and Sidama Region and on the east by the Guji Zone. Its administrative center is Bule Hora.

The West Guji Zone was created by nine districts and two towns taken from the Borena Zone and Guji Zone.

Demographics
Based on the 2007 Census conducted by the Central Statistical Agency of Ethiopia, this Zone has a total population of 1,424,267 of whom 105,443 are Urban residents.

Peace and stability

References

Oromia Region
Zones of Ethiopia